Csaba Gera (born 25 April 1977) is a Hungarian judoka.

Achievements

See also
Hungarian Judo Association
Martial arts manual
2017 World Judo Championships
2021 World Judo Championships

References

External links
 

1977 births
Living people
Hungarian male judoka
Place of birth missing (living people)